Alfred Crout Harmer (August 8, 1825 – March 6, 1900) was a Republican member of the United States House of Representatives from Pennsylvania.

Biography

Harmer was born in Germantown section of Philadelphia.  Began work as a shoe manufacturer. He became a member of the Philadelphia City Council, serving from 1856–1860 and then a recorder of deeds for Philadelphia 1860–1863. He was a delegate to the 1868 Republican National Convention.

He was elected as a Republican in 1870 for and served two terms.  He was defeated in 1874, but he was elected again in 1876. He served until his death in 1900 and was interred in West Laurel Hill Cemetery in Bala Cynwyd, Pennsylvania.

See also
List of United States Congress members who died in office (1900–1949)

References

Sources

The Political Graveyard
"Memorial addresses on the life and character of Alfred C. Harmer, late a representative from Pennsylvania delivered in the House of Representatives and Senate frontispiece 1901"

1825 births
1900 deaths
Politicians from Philadelphia
Philadelphia City Council members
Burials at West Laurel Hill Cemetery
Burials in Pennsylvania
Republican Party members of the United States House of Representatives from Pennsylvania
Germantown Academy alumni
19th-century American politicians